Grayson Lake State Park is a Kentucky state park located in Carter and Elliott counties, near the city of Grayson, Kentucky. It has facilities for boating, water skiing, swimming, fishing and golfing. It is served by Kentucky Route 7, which was re-routed as a result of the lake's creation.

References

External links
Grayson Lake State Park Kentucky Department of Parks

Protected areas of Carter County, Kentucky
State parks of Kentucky
Protected areas established in 1970
Protected areas of Elliott County, Kentucky
1970 establishments in Kentucky